Clare Wren (born May 4, 1962, as Helen Claire Wren) is an American actress. She is best known as Rachel Dunn on The Young Riders.

Life and career

Born in New Orleans, Louisiana, and raised in Texarkana, Arkansas. Her father is a doctor and her mother is a pianist with two sisters, Nancy and Roberta Atkinson.

As a youth, she participated extensively in gymnastic competitions, training at the prestigious Olympia Training Center in Louisiana, but she injured her knee in a competition during her senior year of high school, she was propelled to seek alternatives for her future. That fall, she was accepted at Southern Methodist University in Dallas, Texas where she spent her first year on crutches, recovering from extensive knee surgery. While at University, she became heavily involved in theater, and ended up graduating from the Professional Acting Program along with a degree in psychology. After graduating from college, she moved to Los Angeles to further pursue her acting career.

She resides in Los Angeles with her husband actor William Russ and 2 children.

Filmography 
Films
Extremities (1986)
No Man's Land (1987)
Season of Fear (1989)
Steel and Lace (1991)
Midnight Edition (1993)
Lunker Lake (1997)

Television
Who's the Boss? Episode:Welcome Wagon Lady (1987)
Jake and the Fatman (1987)
Hunter (1989)
Mancuso, F.B.I. Episode:Suspicious Minds (1989)
In the Heat of the Night (1989)
Joe Bob's Drive-In Theater (1991)
The Young Riders (1990 - 1992) 
Civil Wars (1993)
Jack's Place (1993)
The Adventures of Brisco County, Jr. (1994)
Pointman Episode:Treasure Hunt (1995)
Law & Order Season 6 Episode:Humiliation (1995)
ER Season 3 Episode:Post Mortem (1997)
Soul Man (1998)
Nash Bridges Season 5 Episode:Smash and Grab (1999)
NYPD Blue (2004)
JAG (2005)

References

External links 
 
 Claire Wren - Class of 1980 - Transfer from Trinity Heights Academy in Shreveport

1962 births
Living people
American film actresses
American television actresses
Actresses from New Orleans
20th-century American actresses
21st-century American actresses
People from Texarkana, Arkansas
Actresses from Arkansas